The Kreis Thusis forms, together with the sub-districts of Avers, Domleschg, Rheinwald and Schams, the  ("district") Hinterrhein of the Canton Graubünden in Switzerland.  The district office is located in Thusis.

Districts of Graubünden